Shene-Busa (Shene Buusa) is a rural locality (an ulus) in Zaigrayevsky District, Republic of Buryatia, Russia. The population was 416 as of 2010. There are 4 streets.

Geography 
Shene-Busa is located 22 km southeast of Zaigrayevo (the district's administrative centre) by road. Ilka is the nearest rural locality.

References 

Rural localities in Zaigrayevsky District